Chokkanavur is a village in the Pattukkottai taluk of Thanjavur district, Tamil Nadu, India.

Demographics 

As per the 2001 census, Chokkanavur had a total population of 1295 with 637 males and 658 females. The sex ratio was 1033. The literacy rate was 69.

References 

 

Villages in Thanjavur district